This list of Sri Lankan broadcasters includes notable broadcasters from the country of Sri Lanka.

A

Chitrananda Abeysekera
Karunaratne Abeysekera

B

K. S. Balachandran
Leon Belleth
Nihal Bhareti
Jimmy Bharucha

C

Vernon Corea
Vijaya Corea

D

Owen de Abrew
Premakeerthi De Alwis
Asoka de Silva
Dayananda de Silva
Sugathapala De Silva
A.W.Dharmapala
KDK Dharmawardena

E

F

Elmo Fernando
Eric Fernando
Mark Antony Fernando
Prosper Fernando

G

Christopher Greet
H.M.Gunasekera
Dayananda Gunawardena
Thevis Guruge

Biso Menike Grero
Gunathilaka Gajanayake

H

Bob Harvie
Tim Horshington

I

J

Tilak Jayaratne
Mervyn Jayasuriya
Sumana Jayatillake
Mahieash Johnney

K
Kapila M.Gamage

L

M

Manohar Mahajan
S.P.Mylvaganam

N

P

Eardley Peiris
Norton Pereira
Palitha Perera
Shirley Perera

Q

R

Greg Roskowski

Prabha Ranatunge

S

Seelaratna Senarath
Kailayar Sellanainar Sivakumaran
Satsorupavathy Nathan

T

V
Vasantha Vaidyanathan

 [Vasanta Lankatilake]

W

Livy Wijemanne

X

Y

Z

References

Broadcasting in Sri Lanka
Broadcasters
Sri Lanka